Kotari is a village in Prayagraj, Uttar Pradesh, India.

Pin Code: 221507

References

Villages in Allahabad district